Eileen O'Keeffe (born 31 May 1981 in Kilkenny) is a former female hammer thrower from Ireland. Her personal best throw of 73.21 metres, achieved in July 2007 at the national championships in Dublin, is the Irish record for the event. Over her career, she represented Ireland at the 2008 Beijing Olympics, competed three times at the World Championships in Athletics (2005, 2007, 2009), and took part in the European Athletics Championships on two occasions. She won nine consecutive national hammer titles and also six titles in the discus throw.

She finished fourth at the 2003 Summer Universiade, sixth at the 2005 Summer Universiade, won the silver medal at the 2007 Summer Universiade and finished sixth at the 2007 World Championships. She also competed at the 2002 European Championships, the 2005 World Championships, the 2006 European Championships and the 2008 Olympic Games without reaching the final.

In a January 2008 interview on RTÉ's The Panel, O'Keeffe said that she learned the sport from a Hal Connolly DVD her brother bought from a pound shop.

She retired from competition in 2011 at the age of 29, having failed to return to form following a serious knee injury.

Competition record

References

Living people
1981 births
People from Kilkenny (city)
Irish female hammer throwers
Athletes (track and field) at the 2008 Summer Olympics
Olympic athletes of Ireland
World Athletics Championships athletes for Ireland
Universiade medalists in athletics (track and field)
Universiade silver medalists for Ireland
Competitors at the 2003 Summer Universiade
Competitors at the 2005 Summer Universiade
Competitors at the 2009 Summer Universiade
Medalists at the 2007 Summer Universiade
AAA Championships winners